Marina B. Ruggles-Wrenn is an American aerospace and mechanical engineer known for her research on advanced materials for extreme environments in aerospace applications. She is a professor of aerospace engineering in the Department of Aeronautics and Astronautics at the Air Force Institute of Technology.

Education and career
Ruggles-Wrenn was a mechanical engineering student at the Polytechnic Institute of New York, graduating in 1981. She went to the Rensselaer Polytechnic Institute for graduate study, earning a master's degree in 1983 and completing her Ph.D. in 1987.

After working as a researcher at the Oak Ridge National Laboratory from 1987 to 2003, she joined the Air Force Institute of Technology faculty as an associate professor in 2003. She was promoted to full professor in 2009.

Recognition
Ruggles-Wrenn was named an ASME Fellow in 2003. In 2014 the National Aeronautic Association gave her their Katherine and Marjorie Stinson Trophy, "for dedicating over 27 years of her professional life to advancing the state-of-the-art in aerospace structures, design, and materials".

References

Year of birth missing (living people)
Living people
American aerospace engineers
American mechanical engineers
American women engineers
Polytechnic Institute of New York University alumni
Rensselaer Polytechnic Institute alumni
Oak Ridge National Laboratory people
Air University (United States Air Force) faculty
Fellows of the American Society of Mechanical Engineers